WBCI (105.9 FM) is a radio station licensed to Bath, Maine, United States, the station serves the Portland, Lewiston–Auburn, and Augusta-Waterville areas.  The station is owned by Blount Communications.

History
Originally on 95.3 MHz, WJTO-FM began in June 1971.  WJTO-FM was co-owned with WJTO (730 AM).  WJTO-FM later became WIGY with a contemporary hit radio format.  Later the station changed formats and calls to classic rock WKRH on January 10, 1991. WKRH eventually went silent and was purchased by Blount Communications; on May 1, 1995, the station changed its call sign to the current WBCI.

References

1992 Broadcasting & Cable Yearbook

External links 

Bath, Maine
Moody Radio affiliate stations
Radio stations established in 1971
1971 establishments in Maine
BCI